Khalidia is a town and commune in the Ben Arous Governorate, Tunisia.

See also
List of cities in Tunisia

References

Populated places in Ben Arous Governorate
Communes of Tunisia
Tunisia geography articles needing translation from French Wikipedia